The St. Catherine of Sienna Convent is a historic convent in Springfield, Kentucky. It was built in 1904-05 and added to the National Register in 1989.

It is a three-and-a-half-story brick with stone trim building with pedimented pavilions at center and ends.  It was designed by architect Frank Brewer in Classical Revival style.  A chapel was added on the east side during 1922–1930.

References

Churches on the National Register of Historic Places in Kentucky
Neoclassical architecture in Kentucky
Roman Catholic churches completed in 1905
National Register of Historic Places in Washington County, Kentucky
Roman Catholic churches in Springfield, Kentucky
Convents in the United States
20th-century Roman Catholic church buildings in the United States
Neoclassical church buildings in the United States
1905 establishments in Kentucky